Saludos Amigos (Spanish for "Greetings, Friends") is a 1942 American live-action/animated anthology film produced by Walt Disney and released by RKO Radio Pictures. It is the sixth Disney animated feature film and the first of the six package films produced by Walt Disney Productions in the 1940s. Set in Latin America, it is made up of four different segments; Donald Duck stars in two of them and Goofy stars in one. It also features the first appearance of José Carioca, the Brazilian cigar-smoking parrot. Saludos Amigos premiered in Rio de Janeiro on August 24, 1942. It was released in the United States on February 6, 1943. Saludos Amigos was popular enough that Walt Disney decided to make another film about Latin America, The Three Caballeros, to be produced two years later. At 42 minutes, it is Disney's shortest animated feature to date.

Background

In early 1941, before U.S. entry into World War II, the United States Department of State commissioned a Disney goodwill tour of South America, intended to lead to a movie to be shown in the US, Central, and South America as part of the Good Neighbor Policy. This was being done because several Latin American governments had close ties with Nazi Germany, and the US government wanted to counteract those ties. Mickey Mouse and other Disney characters were popular in Latin America, and Walt Disney acted as ambassador. The tour, facilitated by Nelson Rockefeller, who had recently been appointed as Coordinator of Inter-American Affairs (CIAA), took Disney and a group of roughly twenty composers, artists, technicians, etc. from his studio to South America, mainly to Brazil and Argentina, but also to Chile and Peru.

The film itself was given federal loan guarantees, because the Disney studio had over-expanded just before European markets were closed to them by the war, and because Disney was struggling with labor unrest at the time (including a strike that was underway at the time the goodwill journey began).

The film included live-action documentary sequences featuring footage of modern Latin American cities with skyscrapers and fashionably dressed residents. This surprised many contemporary US viewers, who associated such images only with US and European cities, and contributed to a changing impression of Latin America. Film historian Alfred Charles Richard Jr. has commented that Saludos Amigos "did more to cement a community of interest between peoples of the Americas in a few months than the State Department had in fifty years".

The film also inspired Chilean cartoonist René Ríos Boettiger to create Condorito, one of Latin America's most ubiquitous cartoon characters. Ríos perceived that the character Pedro, a small, incapable airplane, was a slight to Chileans and created a comic that could supposedly rival Disney's comic characters.

Film segments
This film features four different segments, each of which begin with various clips of the Disney artists roaming the country, drawing cartoons of some of the local cultures and scenery.

Lake Titicaca
In this segment, American tourist Donald Duck visits Lake Titicaca in Peru and meets some of the locals, including an obstinate llama.

Pedro
Pedro is about a small anthropomorphic airplane from an airport near Santiago, Chile, engaging in his first flight to retrieve air mail from Mendoza, with disastrous consequences. He manages to safely return to the airfield with the mail, which happens to be a single postcard. RKO Pictures released this particular segment as a theatrical short on May 13, 1955.

Chilean cartoonist René Ríos Boettiger (known popularly as "Pepo") was disappointed with how the character Pedro represented his country. In response, he developed the character Condorito, who went on to become one of the most iconic comic magazine characters in Latin America.

El Gaucho Goofy
In this segment, American cowboy Goofy gets taken from Texas to the Argentinian pampas by the Narrator to learn the ways of the native gaucho. This segment was later edited for the film's Gold Classic Collection VHS/DVD release to remove one scene in which Goofy is shown smoking a cigarette. This edit appears again on the Classic Caballeros Collection DVD. This sequence has since been restored as the unedited version has been much requested. The fully unedited version is available as a bonus feature on the Walt & El Grupo DVD release and fully unedited and restored on Saludos Amigos And The Three Caballeros 75th Anniversary Edition 2-Movie Collection Blu-Ray. When the film was released on Disney's streaming platform Disney+, the edited version of the sequence was used despite disclaimers of the film being presented in its original format with "outdated cultural depictions" and tobacco usage, but it has since been changed to the unedited version.

Aquarela do Brasil
Aquarela do Brasil (Portuguese for "Watercolor of Brazil"), the finale of the film, involves a brand-new character, José Carioca from Rio de Janeiro, Brazil, showing Donald Duck around South America, having a drink of cachaça with him and introducing him to the samba (to the tunes of "Aquarela do Brasil" and "Tico-Tico no Fubá").

Cast and characters 

 Lee Blair – himself
 Mary Blair – herself
 Pinto Colvig – Goofy
 Walt Disney – himself
 Norman Ferguson – himself
 Frank Graham – himself
 Clarence Nash – Donald Duck
 José do Patrocínio Oliveira – José Carioca (Used in the Brazilian Portuguese version)
 Fred Shields – narrator
 Frank Thomas – himself
 Stuart Buchanan – flight attendant

Soundtrack
The film's original score was composed by Edward H. Plumb, Paul J. Smith, and Charles Wolcott. The title song, "Saludos Amigos", was written for the film by Charles Wolcott and Ned Washington. The film also featured the song "Aquarela do Brasil", written by the popular Brazilian songwriter Ary Barroso and performed by Aloísio de Oliveira, and an instrumental version of "Tico-Tico no Fubá", written by Zequinha de Abreu. "Aquarela do Brasil" was written and first performed in 1939, but did not achieve much initial success. However, after appearing in this film it became an international hit, becoming the first Brazilian song to be played over a million times on American radio.

The film's soundtrack was first released by Decca Records in 1944 as a collection of three 78rpm singles.

Track listing
 Side 1: "Saludos Amigos" b/w Side 2: "Inca Suite"
 Side 3: "Brazil ("Aquarela do Brazil")" b/w Side 4: "Argentine Country Dances"
 Side 5: "Tico-Tico" b/w Side 6: "Pedro from Chile"

Release

Theatrical
Saludos Amigos premiered in Rio de Janeiro on August 24, 1942. It was released in the United States on February 6, 1943. It was theatrically reissued in 1949, when it was shown on a double bill with the first reissue of Dumbo.

The film returned rentals to RKO by 1951 of $1,135,000 with $515,000 being generated in the U.S. and Canada.

Home media
In 1995, the film was released on Laserdisc under the "Exclusive Archive Collection" series.

It was later released on both VHS and DVD on May 2, 2000 under the Walt Disney Gold Classic Collection banner, and again on DVD on April 29, 2008 under the Classic Caballeros Collection banner.  The film received a third DVD release on November 30, 2010, as a bonus Feature on the Walt & El Grupo DVD.  A fourth release, the first on Blu-ray, was released on January 30, 2018 as Saludos Amigos And The Three Caballeros 75th Anniversary Edition 2-Movie Collection).

Awards and nominations

See also
 Walt & El Grupo, a documentary film about the making of Saludos Amigos and The Three Caballeros
 1942 in film
 List of American films of 1942
 List of Walt Disney Pictures films
 List of Disney theatrical animated features
 List of animated feature films of the 1940s
 List of films with live action and animation
 List of package films
 South of the Border with Disney

References

External links

 
 
 
 
 
 
 
 

1940s American animated films
American films with live action and animation
1942 animated films
1942 films
1940s English-language films
American aviation films
Articles containing video clips
Donald Duck films
Films directed by Norman Ferguson
Films directed by Wilfred Jackson
Films directed by Jack Kinney
Films directed by Hamilton Luske
Films directed by Bill Roberts
Films produced by Walt Disney
Films scored by Paul Smith (film and television composer)
Films set in Argentina
Films set in Bolivia
Films set in Brazil
Films set in Chile
Films set in Peru
Films set in Rio de Janeiro (city)
Films set in South America
Goofy (Disney) films
Animated anthology films
Self-reflexive films
Walt Disney Animation Studios films
Walt Disney Pictures animated films
1940s children's animated films
Films about gauchos
1940s children's fantasy films